Joffroy's sign is a clinical sign in which there is a lack of wrinkling of the forehead when a patient looks up with the head bent forwards. It occurs in patients with exophthalmos in Graves disease.

The sign is named after Alexis Joffroy.

References

External links 

Symptoms and signs: Endocrinology, nutrition, and metabolism